The 1884 Indiana gubernatorial election was held on November 4, 1884. Democratic former Governor Isaac P. Gray defeated Republican nominee William H. Calkins with 49.51% of the vote.

General election

Candidates
Major party candidates
Isaac P. Gray, Democratic, Lieutenant Governor under James D. Williams
William H. Calkins, Republican, U.S. Representative from Indiana's 13th congressional district

Other candidates
Hiram Z. Leonard, National
Robert S. Dwiggins, Prohibition

Results

References

1884
Indiana
Gubernatorial